In Greek mythology,
Enyo is a war goddess (Ἐνυώ "horror" the "waster of cities") and is one of the Graeae (Graiai\Graiae), also called the Grey Sisters, or the Phorcides ("daughters of Phorcys")
Enyo, one of the Graeae in Greek mythology

Enyo may also refer to:

Enyo (moth), a genus of moths
Enyo Krastovchev (born 1984), a Bulgarian footballer
Enyo (software), a JavaScript framework

See also

Tettey-Enyo